Packers Camp is a locality in the Cairns Region, Queensland, Australia.

Geography 
Pine Creek forms the northern boundary of the locality; Pine Creek Yarrabah Road forms the eastern and southern boundary of the locality; the Mackey Creek forms the western boundary. Simmonds Creek traverses the locality from south to north. All of these creeks become tributaries of the Redbank Creek which flows into Trinity Inlet and then to the Coral Sea at Cairns City.

Redbank Road runs from north to the south within the locality, connecting at the south to Wrights Creek and Gordonvale and through them to the Bruce Highway.

The land is flat and low-lying (less than 10 metres above sea level) and almost entirely freehold. The land is principally used for agricultural, mostly for growing sugarcane, with some scattered rural residences, mostly along Redbank Road. There is a cane tramway passing through the locality to transport the harvested sugarcane to the Mulgrave Sugar Mill.

History 
Packers Camp is situated in the Yidinji traditional Aboriginal country. 
The locality was originally known as Highclere but its name changed to Highleigh in 1896. Later it became known as Packer Camp as it was the place where the horse, mule and bullock teams were loaded for the trip over the range to the goldfields.

A postal receiving office in 1895 but closed in 1898. In 1951 the Packers Creek post office opened, closing in 1971.

References 

Cairns Region
Localities in Queensland